Andre van Deventer , born 1930 was a South African Army officer who served as the Chief of Staff Finance from 1976 - 1979 and later Secretary of the State Security Council until 1985.

He joined the Permanent Force in 1955 and commanded 2 South African Infantry Battalion from January 1965 until December 1967 when he became the Commanding Officer of SWA Command. He later served as Officer Commanding Orange Free State Command and North West Command.

In 1974 he was appointed General Officer Commanding of I South African Corps. During the Angolan Civil War (1975-1976) he served as Commander of Task Force 101.

He served as Chief of Staff Finance from 1 October 1976 to 6 August 1979. He later served as the Secretary of the State Security Council till 1985.

Awards and decorations

References

|-

|-

South African Army generals
1930 births
Living people
Graduates of the Staff College, Camberley